Nonlinear frictiophoresis is the unidirectional drift of a particle in a medium caused by periodic driving force with zero mean. The effect is possible due to nonlinear dependence of the friction-drag force on the particle's velocity. It was discovered theoretically.,
and is mainly known as nonlinear electrofrictiophoresis

.
At first glance, a periodic driving force with zero mean is able to entrain a particle into an oscillating movement without unidirectional drift, because integral momentum provided to the particle by the force is zero. The possibility of unidirectional drift can be recognized if one takes into account that the particle itself loses momentum through transferring it further to the medium it moves in/at. If the friction is nonlinear, then it may so happen that the momentum loss during movement in one direction does not equal to that in the opposite direction and this causes unidirectional drift. For this to happen, the driving force time-dependence must be more complicated than it is in a single sinusoidal harmonic.

A simple example - Bingham plastic

Nonlinear friction

The simplest case of friction-velocity dependence law is the
Stokes's one:
 
where  is the friction/drag force applied to a particle moving with velocity  in a medium. The friction-velocity law (1) is observed for a slowly moving spherical particle in a Newtonian fluid. It is linear, see Fig. 1, and is not suitable for nonlinear frictiophoresis to take place. The characteristic property of the law (1) is that any, even a very small driving force is able to get particle moving. This is not the case for such media as Bingham plastic. For those media, it is necessary to apply some threshold force, to get the particle moving. This kind of friction-velocity (dry friction) law has a jump discontinuity at :
  

It is nonlinear, see Fig. 2, and is used in this example.

Periodic driving force
Let  denote the period of driving force. Chose a time
value 
such that 
and two force values, 
such that the following relations are
satisfied:

The periodic driving force 
used in this example is as follows:

It is clear that, due to (3),  has zero mean:

See also Fig. 3.

Unidirectional drift

For the sake of simplicity, we consider here the physical situation when inertia may be neglected. The latter can be achieved if
particle's mass is small, velocity is low and friction is high. This conditions have to ensure that ,
where  is the relaxation time. In this situation, the particle driven with force (4) immediately starts moving with constant velocity 
 during interval

and will immediately
stop moving during interval , see Fig. 4.

This results in the
positive mean velocity of unidirectional drift:

Mathematical analysis

Analysis of possibility to get a nonzero drift by periodic force with
zero integral has been made in
.
The dimensionless
equation of motion for a particle driven by periodic force
is as follows:

where the friction/drag force
 satisfies
the following:

It is proven in 
that any solution to (5)
settles down onto periodic regime

almost certainly, provided 
is not antiperiodic.

For , two cases of  have been considered explicitly:

1. Saw-shaped driving force, see Fig. 5:

In this case, found in 
, has the following mean value:

This estimate is made expecting .

2. Two harmonics driving force,

In this case, the first order in  approximation
has the following mean value:

Another type of analysis, based on symmetry breaking suggests as well that a zero mean driving force is able to generate a directed drift.

Applications
 In applications, the nature of force  in (5), is usually electric, similar to forces acting during standard electrophoresis. The only differences are that the force is periodic and without constant component.
For the effect to show up, the dependence of friction/drag force on velocity must be nonlinear. This is the case for numerous substances known as non-Newtonian fluids. Among these are gels, and dilatant fluids, pseudoplastic fluids, liquid crystals.

Dedicated experiments
have determined  for a standard DNA ladder up to 1500 bp long in 1.5% agarose gel. The dependence found, see Fig. 6, supports the possibility of nonlinear frictiophoresis in such a system. Based on data in  Fig. 6, an optimal time course for driving electric field with zero mean, has been found in, which ensures maximal drift for 1500 b.p. long fragment,
see Fig. 7.

The effect of unidirectional drift caused by periodic force with zero integral value has a peculiar dependence on the time course of the force applied.  See the previous section for examples. This offers a new dimension to a set of separation problems.

DNA separation with respect to length
In the DNA fragments separation,
zero mean periodic electric field is used in zero-integrated-field electrophoresis (ZIFE),
where the field time dependence similar to that shown in Fig. 3 is used.
This allows to separate long fragments in agarose gel,
nonseparable by standard constant field electrophoresis.
The long DNA geometry and its manner of movement in a gel,
known as reptation
do not allow to apply directly the consideration based on Eq. (5), above.

Separation with respect to specific mass
It was observed,

that under certain physical conditions
the mechanism described in Mathematical analysis section, above,
can be used for separation with respect to specific mass,
like particles made of isotopes of the same material.

Extensions
The idea of organizing directed drift with zero mean periodic drive
have obtained further development for other configurations
and other physical mechanism of nonlinearity.

Rotation by means of circular wave
An electric dipole
rotating freely around -axis
in a medium with nonlinear friction can be manipulated by
applying electromagnetic wave polarized circularly along 
and composed of two harmonics. The equation of motion
for this system is as follows:

where  is the torque acting on the dipole due to
circular wave: 

where  is the dipole moment component orthogonal
to -axis
and  defines the dipole direction in the  plane. By choosing proper
phase shift  in (6) it is possible to
orient the dipole in any desired direction, .
The direction  is
attained due to angular directed drift, which becomes zero when
.

A small detuning between the first and second harmonic in (6) results in continuous rotational drift.

Modification of potential function

If a particle undergoes a directed drift while moving freely in accordance
with Eq. (5), then it drifts similarly if a shallow enough
potential field  is imposed. Equation of motion in that case is:

where  is the force due to potential field. This kind of behavior, as rigorous mathematical analysis shows, 
This may  change the  qualitatively, by, e.g. changing the number of equilibrium points, see Fig. 8. The effect may be essential during high frequency
electric field acting on biopolymers.

Another nonlinearity
For electrophoresis of colloid particles under a small strength electric field, the force 
in the right-hand side of Eq. (5) is linearly proportional to the
strength  of the electric field applied. For a high strength,
the linearity is broken due to nonlinear polarization.
As a result, the force may depend nonlinearly on the applied field:

In the last expression, even if
the applied field,  has zero mean, the applied force  may happen to have a constant component that can cause a directed drift.

As above, for this to happen,  must have more than a single sinusoidal harmonic.
This same effect for a liquid in a tube may serve in
electroosmotic pump
driven with zero mean electric field.

References

Fluid mechanics